The Shor language (endonym: шор тили, тадар тили) is a Turkic language spoken by about 2,800 people in a region called Mountain Shoriya, in the Kemerovo Province in Southwest Siberia, although the entire Shor population in this area is over 12,000 people. Presently, not all ethnic Shors speak Shor and the language suffered a decline from the late 1930s to the early 1980s. During this period the Shor language was neither written nor taught in schools. However, since the 1980s and 1990s there has been a Shor language revival. The language is now taught at the Novokuznetsk branch of the Kemerovo State University.

Like other Siberian Turkic languages, Shor has borrowed many roots from Mongolian, as well as words from Russian. The two main dialects are Mrassu and Kondoma, named after the rivers in whose valleys they are spoken. From the point of view of classification of Turkic languages, these dialects belong to different branches of Turkic: According to the reflexes of the Proto-Turkic (PT) intervocalic -d- in modern languages (compare PT *adak, in modern Turkic languages meaning 'foot' or 'leg'), the Mrassu dialect is a -z- variety: azaq, the Kondoma dialect is a -y- variety: ayaq. This feature normally distinguishes different branches of Turkic which means that the Shor language has formed from different Turkic sources.

Each Shor dialect has subdialectal varieties. The Upper-Mrassu and the Upper-Kondoma varieties have developed numerous close features in the course of close contacts between their speakers in the upper reaches of the Kondoma and Mrassu rivers.

The Mrassu dialect served as a basis for literary Shor language both in the 1930s and in the 1980s when the written form of the Shor language was revitalized after a break (of almost 50 years) in its written history. However, the Kondoma dialect norms are also largely accepted.

Shor was first written with a Cyrillic alphabet introduced by Christian missionaries in the middle of the 19th century. After a number of changes, the modern Shor alphabet is written in another modified Cyrillic alphabet.

In 2005, to highlight the endangered status of the language, Gennady Kostochakov published a book of poems in Shor, entitled "I am the Last Shor Poet". In 2017, a Shor translation of Alice's Adventures in Wonderland by Liubovʹ Arbaçakova was published.

Morphology and syntax

Pronouns 

Shor has seven personal pronouns:

Phonology

Vowels

Consonants

Writing system

History 
Before the 19th century the Shor language had remained unwritten; in the 1870s Orthodox missionaries made the first effort to create a Cyrillic Shor alphabet. In spite of all the efforts by the missionaries, the percentage of literacy among the native population increased very slowly — by the beginning of the 20th century they constituted only about 1% of the Shors.

The Shor written language had its 'golden age' in the 1920s. In 1927, a second attempt was made to create a Shor alphabet based on Cyrillic. In 1932-1933, Fedor Cispijakov wrote and published a new primer based on the Latin alphabet. This however considerably complicated the process of learning; thus in 1938, the same author together with Georgij Babuskin created a new variant of the primer based on the Cyrillic alphabet, of which several editions have been published since then.

Missionary alphabet 
The first book written in the Shor language was published in 1885.
It used a modified Russian alphabet (excluding Ё ё, Ф ф, Щ щ, and Ѣ ѣ) with additional letters Ј ј, Ҥ ҥ, Ӧ ӧ, and Ӱ ӱ.

In 1927 an official alphabet was adopted, being the Russian alphabet (excluding Ё ё and ъ) with additional letters Ј ј, Ҥ ҥ, Ӧ ӧ, and Ӱ ӱ.

Latin alphabet 
A Latin alphabet for the Shor language was introduced in 1930: A a, B в, C c, D d, Ə ə, F f, G g, Ƣ ƣ, I i, J j, K k, Q q, M m, N n, Ꞑ ꞑ, O o, Ө ө, P p, R r, S s, T t, U u, V v, Ş ş, Z z, Ƶ ƶ, L l, Ь ь, Y y, Į į.

The order of the letters was later changed to correspond with alphabets for other languages in the Soviet Union, the letter Ә ә was replaced with E e, and the letter Į į was dropped.

Modern alphabet 
In 1938 the Latin alphabet was replaced with a Cyrillic one.  It used the Russian alphabet with additional letters Ӧ ӧ, Ӱ ӱ, and Нъ нъ.
After reforms in 1980 it reached its present form: А а, Б б, В в, Г г, Ғ ғ, Д д, Е е, Ё ё, Ж ж, З з, И и, Й й, К к, Қ қ, Л л, М м, Н н, Ң ң, О о, Ӧ ӧ, П п, Р р, С с, Т т, У у, Ӱ ӱ, Ф ф, Х х, Ц ц, Ч ч, Ш ш, Щ щ, Ъ ъ, Ы ы, Ь ь, Э э, Ю ю, Я я.

Comparison of Shor alphabets

References

Further reading
 Roos, Marti, Hans Nugteren, and Zinaida Waibel. Khakas and Shor proverbs and proverbial sayings. Exploring the Eastern Frontiers of Turkic, ed. by Marcel Erdal and Irina Nevskaya, pp. 60 (2006): 157-192. (Turcologica 60.) Wiesbaden: Harrassowitz.
  Донидзе Г. И. Шорский язык / Языки мира. Тюркские языки. — М., 1997.

External links

 Endangered Languages of Indigenous Peoples of Siberia: The Shor language
 The Red Book of the Peoples of the Russian Empire: The Shors
 The Shor alphabet

Agglutinative languages
Siberian Turkic languages
Languages of Russia
Turkic languages